Carrie Isaac is an American politician serving as the Texas State Representative for District 73 since 2023. She is a member of the Republican Party.

Career
Since 2017, Isaac has been the executive director of the Digital Education & Work Initiative of Texas, a nonprofit organization.

Texas House of Representatives

Elections

2020
 Isaac was the Republican nominee for District 45 in the 2020 election but lost to incumbent Democrat Erin Zwiener.

2022

Isaac was elected as the state representative for District 73 in the 2022 election to succeed retiring Representative Kyle Biedermann.

Caucus memberships
 Texas Freedom Caucus

Political positions

Abortion
Isaac is anti-choice on abortion.

Education
Isaac is a supporter of charter schools and opposes the idea of critical race theory.

Personal life
Isaac resides in Wimberley, TX. She and her husband, Jason, have two children.

Electoral history

References

Living people
People from Dripping Springs, Texas
Republican Party members of the Texas House of Representatives
21st-century American politicians
Texas Republicans
Year of birth missing (living people)